"Ausländer" (German for "Foreigner") is a song by German Neue Deutsche Härte band Rammstein. It was released as the third single from the band's untitled seventh studio album; it received a music video release on 28 May 2019 and physical releases on 31 May. It reached number two in Germany and the top 40 in Austria and Switzerland.

Music video
The video was released online on 28 May 2019 at 19:00 CET following a 15-second preview for the video one day prior. The video was directed by Jörn Heitmann and filmed in Cape Town.

Track listing

Charts

Certifications

Release history

References

2019 singles
German-language songs
Rammstein songs
Songs written by Till Lindemann
Songs written by Paul Landers
Songs written by Richard Z. Kruspe
Songs written by Christian Lorenz
Songs written by Oliver Riedel
Songs written by Christoph Schneider